Pape Landing Sambou (born December 25, 1987) is a Senegal-born football player who has represented Gabon at international level.

International career 

Sambou represented Senegal at U23 level during qualification for the 2007 All-Africa Games football tournament.

He represented Gabon in an international friendly versus South Africa on 15 July 2012.

References 

1987 births
Living people
Senegalese footballers
Association football defenders
Olympique de Ngor players
Gabonese footballers
Gabon international footballers
21st-century Gabonese people